Prakash Raj is an Indian actor, film director, producer and television presenter who mainly works in the South Indian film industry. He acted in back-to-back stage shows for 300 a month in the initial stages of his career when he joined Kalakshetra, Bengaluru, and he has 2,000 street theatre performances to his credit.

After working in the Kannada television industry and Kannada cinema for a few years, he made his debut in Tamil cinema through Duet (1994) by K. Balachander and has since been a commercially successful film star in Tamil. In remembrance, he named his production company Duet Movies. Prakash Raj's work in various languages like Telugu, Tamil, Kannada, Hindi, Malayalam, Marathi, and English has placed him among the most sought after actors in Indian cinema. He has played a variety of roles, most notably as the antagonist and, of late, as a character actor. Prakash, as an actor has won a National Film Award for Best Supporting Actor in 1998 for Mani Ratnam's Iruvar and a National Film Award for Best Actor in 2009 for his role in Kanchivaram, a Tamil film directed by Priyadarshan, and as a producer has won a National Film Award for Best Feature Film in Kannada for Puttakkana Highway directed by his long-time theatre friend B. Suresh in 2011. Prakash was also the host of Neengalum Vellalam Oru Kodi during the shows second season. He has appeared in 398 films.

Film

As actor

1980–1989

1990–1999

2000–2009

2010–2019

2020–present

Web series

As voice actor

As producer and director

Television

References

Indian filmographies
Male actor filmographies
Director filmographies